The Coptic Catholic Church is an Eastern Catholic particular church in full communion with the Catholic Church. Along with the Ethiopian Catholic Church and Eritrean Catholic Church, it belongs to the Alexandrian liturgical tradition. Uniquely among the Alexandrian Rite Eastern Catholic liturgies, the Coptic Catholic Church uses the Coptic Rite and the Coptic language (derived from Ancient Egyptian) in its liturgy; the Ethiopian Catholic Church and Eritrean Catholic Church use the Ge'ez Rite.

The current Coptic Catholic Patriarch of Alexandria is Ibrahim Isaac Sidrak, who replaced Antonios Naguib in 2013. The offices of the patriarchate are located in Cairo. The patriarchal Cathedral of Our Lady of Egypt is in Nasr City, a suburb of Cairo.

History

Beginnings

Ever since the end of the Council of Chalcedon in the 5th Century and the official secession of the Coptic Church from the Church of Rome, the Catholic Church has attempted to achieve reunion with the Copts in Egypt multiple times. During the Council of Florence in 1442, the Coptic delegates present were persuaded to agree to a reunion with the Papacy in Rome, although the Coptic populace was opposed to the idea, and the union did not take effect. More failed attempts at reunion were undertaken by Coptic delegates in 1560 and 1582.

In the 17th century, at the behest of Pope Urban VIII, Catholic missionaries (primarily Franciscans) started to come to Egypt. In 1630, a number of missions of the Capuchin Order were founded in the Levant by Joseph of Paris, which included Cairo. Although the mission in Cairo initially faced setbacks, tensions with the local Coptic priesthood were minimized with the arrival of Capuchin priest Agathangelo of Vendome to the city in 1633.

Initial relations between Catholics and Copts in Egypt were poor. One Coptic councellor in 1637 referred to the Roman Church in Egypt as "a brothel". Attempts to excommunicate Catholic offenders in the city were seemingly fruitless. Agathangelo would later be hanged as a martyr in Ethiopia by order of the Ethiopian king in 1638, and the mission in Cairo would start to decline.
The Jesuits came in 1675. In 1713, the Coptic Patriarch of Alexandria again submitted to Rome but, as in 1442, the union was not of long duration.

In 1741, Coptic bishop Anba Athanasius of Jerusalem became a Catholic. In 1781, he was appointed by Pope Benedict XIV as vicar apostolic of the less than 2,000 Egyptian Coptic Catholics. Eventually, Athanasius returned to the Coptic Orthodox Church and others served as Catholic vicar apostolic.

Patriarchate 
Under the assumption that the Ottoman viceroy wanted a Catholic patriarch for the Coptic Catholics in 1824, the Pope established the Patriarchate of Alexandria from the Apostolic Vicariate of Syria, Egypt, Arabia and Cyprus  but it was basically titular. The Ottomans in 1829 allowed the Coptic Catholics to build their own churches.

The number of Catholics of this rite increased to the point that Leo XIII in 1895 restored the Catholic patriarchate. He initially named Bishop Cyril Makarios as patriarchal vicar. Makarios then presided over a synod, which led to the introduction of some Latin practices. In 1899, Leo appointed Makarios as patriarch of Alexandria of the Copts, taking the name Cyril II. He resigned in 1908 at the request of the Pope over a controversy. The patriarchate seat remained vacant until an election in 1947 and was administered by an apostolic administrator.

Hierarchy 
The Coptic Catholic Church sui juris comprises a single ecclesiastical province, covering Egypt only. 
The Patriarch is the sole Metropolitan Archbishop, retaining the ancient title Alexandria but his actual seat is in Egypt's modern capital Cairo.

Coptic Catholic Church has eight suffragan bishops, throughout Egypt, comprising the only Coptic Catholic ecclesiastical province: Abu Qurqas, Alexandria (Patriarch's original home seat), Assiut, Giza, Ismailia, Luxor, Minya and Sohag.

Religious orders 
The Coptic Catholic Church does not have Coptic monasteries. Instead the Church has religious congregations such as the three communities for women: the Sisters of the Sacred Heart, the Coptic Sisters of Jesus and Mary (both based in Egypt) and the Egyptian Province of the Little Sisters of Jesus. There is also a community of male Franciscans and Jesuits.

Educational and health services 
More than 100 Coptic Catholic parishes administer primary schools, and some have secondary schools as well. The church maintains a hospital, a number of medical dispensaries and clinics, and several orphanages.

Ecumenism 
Relations between the Coptic Catholic Church and the larger Coptic Orthodox Church are generally very good.

See also 
 Eastern Catholicism
 List of Catholic dioceses in Egypt
 List of Catholic dioceses (structured view)
 List of Coptic Catholic Patriarchs of Alexandria
 Monasticism
 Oriental Orthodox Church

References

Sources and external links 
 
 Coptic Catholic Church page at Fellowship and Aid to the Christians of the East
 Article on "Life in a Coptic Catholic Village"
 "Italian-language video on the Coptic Catholic Church"
 "Video of the ordination of Coptic Catholic deacons"
 Article on the Coptic Catholic Church by Ronald Roberson on the CNEWA web site
 Common Declaration of Pope Paul VI and Pope Alexandria Shenouda III, 1973
 GigaCatholic

 
Eastern Catholicism in Egypt
Coptic Christianity
Christian denominations established in the 18th century
Religious organizations established in the 1740s